Action Stories was a multi-genre pulp magazine published between September 1921 and Fall 1950, with a brief hiatus at the end of 1932.

As an adventure pulp, Action Stories focused on real-world adventure stories. At first the magazine published mainly westerns, but it branched out into sports fiction, war stories and adventures in exotic countries by 1937.  

Writers whose work appeared in Action Stories included Robert E. Howard, Walt Coburn, Morgan Robertson (a number of his stories were posthumously published here), Horace McCoy, Theodore Roscoe, Greye La Spina, Anthony M. Rud, Thomas Thursday and Les Savage, Jr. Action Stories occasionally reprinted fiction by writers such as Jack London and Edgar Wallace. The magazine also carried a Dashiell Hammett story ("Laughing Masks", November 1923) printed under Hammett's "Peter Collinson" pseudonym.

Action Stories had covers illustrated by Norman Saunders, George Gross and Allen Anderson.

References

External links
Magazine Datafile for Action Stories
Illustrated issue checklist
Issue contents (beginning of list, which covers several pages)

Bimonthly magazines published in the United States
Monthly magazines published in the United States
Quarterly magazines published in the United States
Defunct literary magazines published in the United States
Magazines established in 1921
Magazines disestablished in 1950
Pulp magazines
Irregularly published magazines published in the United States